酒 is an East Asian word which means wine or alcoholic beverage.

酒 may refer to:

Jiu or Chinese alcoholic beverages, any alcoholic beverage of China, huangjiu, baijiu, mijiu and so on.
Sul or any traditional alcoholic beverage of Korea, written with the suffix -ju.
Sake (shu), a Japanese alcoholic beverage made from rice.

See also
 燒酒 (disambiguation)